The Petermann orogeny was a mountain building event in the Neoproterozoic through the early Cambrian, 580 to 540 million years ago. The event exhumed the Musgrave Inlier, which divides the Officer Basin and Amadeus Basin in Australia. The orogeny is preserved in the Petermann Thrust Complex, with Mesoproterozoic granite and gneiss crystalline basement rocks, the Mt. Harris basalt, quartz-rich Bloods Range Beds and the Dean Quartzite.

See also
List of orogenies

References

Orogenies of Australia
Proterozoic orogenies